MG is the second solo studio album by English musician and Depeche Mode member Martin Gore, and the first to include self-penned material rather than cover-versions. It was released on 27 April 2015 by Mute Records and consists of sixteen electronic instrumentals. A music video for "Europa Hymn", directed by M-I-E and incorporating illustrations by Jan L. Trigg, was released to YouTube in February 2015.

Reception

At Metacritic, which assigns a normalised rating out of 100 to reviews from mainstream critics, MG received an average score of 70, based on 12 reviews, indicating "generally favorable reviews".

Track listing

MG Remix EP
Martin Gore announced a remix EP, available on double 12” vinyl and digital download via Mute. The EP includes remixes by Andy Stott, Virgil Enzinger and Christoffer Berg, alongside two previously unreleased tracks. In association with BitTorrent, Gore also launched a remix competition for the track “Featherlight”. The winning remix is included on the digital release of Gore's EP.
MG, released on Mute in April 2015 marks the first solo instrumental album from Depeche Mode's Martin Gore. Described by Pitchfork as “a careful sculpting of electricity and air”, the album creates an absorbing and emotional sonic landscape. The deadline for submission was August 21, with a winning remix announced August 31.

Studio equipment
According to interviews with Martin Gore published in Electronic Musician (July 2015), Keyboard Magazine (July 2015) as well as video-interview on his official website, Gore mentioned some instruments (mainly synthesizers, modular synthesizer systems, drum machines) and other equipment he used in the album recording:
 Eurorack modular system
 Elka Synthex
 Gleeman Pentaphonic
 88 DOTCOM system
 Aries modular system
 Digisound 80 modular system
 Synton Fenix
 ARP 2600
 ARP Solina String Ensemble
 Arturia MiniBrute
 Elektron Analog Four
 Elektron Analog Rytm
 Dewanatron Swarmatron
 Octave Plateau Voyetra Eight polyphonic synthesizer module
 Moog Minimoog Voyager
 Moog Memorymoog
 Tiptop Audio Trigger Riot
 Noise Engineering Zularic Repetitor drum module
 Solid State Logic mixing console
 Apple Logic Pro (DAW)
and other equipment.

Personnel
Credits adapted from the liner notes of MG.

 Martin Gore – art direction, design, production
 Q – mixing ; additional programming 
 Will Hinton II – studio assistance
 Stefan Betke – mastering
 Jonathan Kessler – management
 Paul A. Taylor – art direction
 Jan L. Trigg – illustration

Charts

References

External links
 Album information from the official Martin Gore website

2015 albums
Instrumental albums
Martin Gore albums
Mute Records albums